Valetta may refer to:

 , a British opium ship renamed Valetta and wrecked in 1825
 SS Valetta, an early cruise ship built in 1889
 British polacca Valetta, a 4-gun 21-manned ship captured by the Jean Bart in 1810

Ship names